The Belfry Theatre is a theatre and associated theatre company in the Fernwood neighbourhood of Victoria, British Columbia, Canada. The company produces contemporary theatre, with a focus on Canadian work. The theatre building is a converted nineteenth-century church designed by Thomas Hooper.

Mission 
Michael Shamata, the current artistic director of The Belfry, has said that "it is my hope that all of the plays that we produce open a door to a new world." The emphasis of the Belfry's productions has been on Canadian work, and the development of new work through "commissions, dramaturgy, workshops, readings, and first productions."

Building history 
From its construction, between 1887 and 1892, until 1974, the building was the Emmanuel Baptist Church of Fernwood.

The church's congregation formed in 1874. They purchased the plot at Fernwood and Gladstone for $550, and dedicated the Spring Ridge Chapel on February 6, 1887. Under supervision of Rev. Peter H. McEwen, construction completed in 1892. The building continued to function as a church for the next 79 years until April 4, 1971, when the congregation moved to a new sanctuary in Sannich.

In 1974, the building saw its first use as a theatre space when University of Victoria graduate student Blair Shakel rented out the church's chapel. In 1975 Don Shipley (stage director) formed the Springridge Cultural Centre, based on the model of Vancouver's East Cultural Centre (The Cultch). He would later be joined by Pat Armstrong as co-director of the Belfry Cultural Centre, which would go on to be The Belfry.

In 1990 the Belfry company purchased the building. It has since undergone two major renovations, the first completed in 2003, and more recently in 2017.

Production history 
The first theatre production put on by The Belfry was Don Shipley's Puttin' on the Ritz, in 1977. Since then the Belfry has produced over 312 plays, of which more than 233 were Canadian, and at least 47 were premieres.

Some notable plays that premiered at The Belfry are Dan Needles's Wingfield Farm plays (Wingfield Series), Morris Panych's Vigil, and Michele Riml's plays Sexy Laundry and on the edge.

Community engagement 
In accordance to their mission statement, The Belfry has many programs to increase their engagement with the local community.

Belfry 101 (and later additions of 201 and 301) is an educational program unique to the theatre. It gets high school students directly involved behind the scenes with some Belfry productions, giving them opportunity to develop their own creative abilities and practice thinking critically. The students also receive discounted season tickets.

Additional involvement and community events include a talk back feature called B4Play, post-show talk backs Afterplay and Talkback Thursdays, as well as a variety of online resources, including Heart of the Matter, the Belfry Librarian, and access to digital issues of Upstage their magazine publication.

In their 2008-09 Season the Belfry added SPARK festival, in addition to their mainstage shows. SPARK is an effort to support emerging and unique theatre in Canada, and is part of a festival with workshops and free community events.

References

External links
 
 Belfry Theatre | The Canadian Encyclopedia

Buildings and structures in Victoria, British Columbia
Culture of Victoria, British Columbia
Theatre companies in British Columbia
Theatres in British Columbia
1976 establishments in British Columbia